Lord of the Underground: Vishnu and the Magic Elixir is an album by Acid Mothers Temple & The Melting Paraiso U.F.O., released in 2009 by Alien8 Recordings.

Track listing

Personnel

Credits, as stated on the liner notes:

 Tsuyama Atsushi - monster bass, voice, acoustic guitar, alto recorder, flute, toy trumpet, kazoo, cosmic joker
 Higashi Hiroshi - synthesizer, dancin'king
 Shimura Koji - drums, Latino cool
 Kawabata Makoto - electric guitar, Electric Guitar, Bouzouki, Saz, Sitar, Organ, Percussion, Speed Guru

Technical personnel

 Production - Kawabata Makoto
 Mastering - Yoshida Tatsuya
 Guylaine Bédard - Cover Design
 Dale Tomlinson - Photography

References

External links
  Lord of the Underground: Vishnu and the Magic Elixir site at Alien8

2009 albums
Acid Mothers Temple albums